Agapito Gómez Álvarez (born January 30, 1963) is a retired boxer from Spain, who represented his native country at the 1984 Summer Olympics in Los Angeles, California. Fighting in the light flyweight division (– 48 kg), he lost in the tournament's second round to Venezuela's Marcelino Bolivar.

Olympic results
Defeated Mahjoub Mjirich (Morocco) 3-2
Lost to Marcelino Bolivar (Venezuela) 2-3

References
 Spanish Olympic Committee 

1963 births
Living people
Flyweight boxers
Boxers at the 1984 Summer Olympics
Olympic boxers of Spain
Spanish male boxers